The A-side and B-side are the two sides of phonograph records and cassettes; these terms have often been printed on the labels of two-sided music recordings. The A-side usually features a recording that its artist, producer, or record company intends to be the initial focus of promotional efforts and radio airplay and hopefully become a hit record. The B-side (or "flip-side") is a secondary recording that typically receives less attention, although some B-sides have been as successful as, or more so than, their A-sides.

Use of this language has largely declined in the 21st century as the music industry has transitioned away from analog recordings towards digital formats without physical sides, such as CDs, downloads and streaming. Nevertheless, some artists and labels continue to employ the terms A-side and B-side metaphorically to describe the type of content a particular release features, with B-side sometimes representing a "bonus" track or other material. The term B-side carries a more expansive definition in the K-pop industry, referring to all tracks on an album that are not marketed as title tracks.

History
Conventions shifted in the early 1960s, at which point record companies started assigning the song they wanted radio stations to play to side A, as 45 rpm single records ("45s") dominated most markets in terms of cash sales in comparison to albums, which did not fare as well financially. Throughout the decade the industry would slowly shift to an album-driven paradigm for releasing new music; it was not until 1968 that the total production of albums on a unit basis finally surpassed that of singles in the United Kingdom.

Double A-side
A "double A-side", "AA-side", or "Dual single" is a single where both sides are designated the A-side, with no designated B-side; that is, both sides are prospective hit songs and neither side will be promoted over the other. In 1949, Savoy Records promoted a new single by one of its artists, Paul Williams' "House Rocker" and "He Knows How to Hucklebuck", as "The New Double Side Hit – Both Sides "A" Sides". In 1965, Billboard reported that due to a disagreement between EMI and John Lennon about which side of the Beatles' "We Can Work It Out" and "Day Tripper" single should be considered the A-side and receive the plugging, "EMI settled for a double-side promotion campaign—unique in Britain." 

In the UK, before the advent of digital downloads, both A-sides were accredited with the same chart position, for the singles chart was compiled entirely from physical sales. In the UK, the biggest-selling non-charity single of all time was a double A-side, Wings' 1977 release "Mull of Kintyre"/"Girls' School", which sold over two million copies. It was also the UK Christmas No. 1 that year, one of only four occasions on which a double A-side has topped that chart, the others being Queen's 1991 re-release of "Bohemian Rhapsody" with "These Are the Days of Our Lives", Westlife's 1999 release "I Have a Dream"/"Seasons in the Sun", and The Beatles' aforementioned "Day Tripper"/"We Can Work It Out" in 1965. Nirvana released "All Apologies" and "Rape Me" as a double A-side in 1993, and both songs are accredited as a hit on both the UK Singles Chart, and the Irish Singles Chart.

Artists with the most Top 100 double-side singles
 Perry Como (12) and Nat King Cole (19) both had additional double-sided singles on Billboards pre-1955 charts.
Artists having the most US double-sided singles on which each side reached the Billboard Top 40, according to Billboard:

B/W 

The term "b/w", an abbreviation of "backed with", is often used in listings to indicate the B-side of a record. The term "c/w", for "coupled with", is used similarly.

B-side compilations

See also
 B movie

References

Other sources

 MacDonald, Ian. Revolution in the Head: The Beatles' Records and the Sixties – 
 "A History of the 45rpm record" Martland, Peter. EMI: The First 100 Years – 

Audio storage
Music industry